Podbiele may refer to the following places:
Podbiele, Lubusz Voivodeship (west Poland)
Podbiele, Masovian Voivodeship (east-central Poland)
Podbiele, Podlaskie Voivodeship (north-east Poland)